The 2005–06 Dallas Stars season was the Stars' 13th season in the city of Dallas, the 39th overall of the franchise. This was the season following the 2004–05 season which was canceled due to the 2004–05 NHL lockout.

Regular season

Final standings

Schedule and results

Regular season

|- align="center" bgcolor="#CCFFCC" 
|1||W||October 5, 2005||5–4 || align="left"|  Los Angeles Kings (2005–06) ||1–0–0 || 
|- align="center" bgcolor="#FFBBBB"
|2||L||October 8, 2005||2–3 || align="left"|  Colorado Avalanche (2005–06) ||1–1–0 || 
|- align="center" bgcolor="#CCFFCC" 
|3||W||October 11, 2005||3–2 || align="left"|  Phoenix Coyotes (2005–06) ||2–1–0 || 
|- align="center" bgcolor="#CCFFCC" 
|4||W||October 13, 2005||3–2 OT|| align="left"| @ Calgary Flames (2005–06) ||3–1–0 || 
|- align="center" bgcolor="#CCFFCC" 
|5||W||October 14, 2005||3–2 || align="left"| @ Edmonton Oilers (2005–06) ||4–1–0 || 
|- align="center" bgcolor="#FFBBBB"
|6||L||October 16, 2005||2–5 || align="left"| @ Vancouver Canucks (2005–06) ||4–2–0 || 
|- align="center" bgcolor="#FFBBBB"
|7||L||October 20, 2005||2–7 || align="left"|  Los Angeles Kings (2005–06) ||4–3–0 || 
|- align="center" bgcolor="#CCFFCC" 
|8||W||October 22, 2005||2–1 || align="left"|  Calgary Flames (2005–06) ||5–3–0 || 
|- align="center" 
|9||L||October 26, 2005||4–5 OT|| align="left"|  San Jose Sharks (2005–06) ||5–3–1 || 
|- align="center" bgcolor="#FFBBBB"
|10||L||October 28, 2005||3–5 || align="left"|  Edmonton Oilers (2005–06) ||5–4–1 || 
|- align="center" bgcolor="#CCFFCC" 
|11||W||October 29, 2005||5–3 || align="left"| @ Phoenix Coyotes (2005–06) ||6–4–1 || 
|-

|- align="center" bgcolor="#FFBBBB"
|12||L||November 2, 2005||3–6 || align="left"|  Los Angeles Kings (2005–06) ||6–5–1 || 
|- align="center" bgcolor="#CCFFCC" 
|13||W||November 4, 2005||9–1 || align="left"|  Chicago Blackhawks (2005–06) ||7–5–1 || 
|- align="center" bgcolor="#CCFFCC" 
|14||W||November 5, 2005||3–2 SO|| align="left"| @ Colorado Avalanche (2005–06) ||8–5–1 || 
|- align="center" bgcolor="#CCFFCC" 
|15||W||November 7, 2005||4–0 || align="left"|  Edmonton Oilers (2005–06) ||9–5–1 || 
|- align="center" bgcolor="#FFBBBB"
|16||L||November 10, 2005||3–5 || align="left"| @ Nashville Predators (2005–06) ||9–6–1 || 
|- align="center" bgcolor="#CCFFCC" 
|17||W||November 12, 2005||3–2 SO|| align="left"| @ San Jose Sharks (2005–06) ||10–6–1 || 
|- align="center" bgcolor="#CCFFCC" 
|18||W||November 13, 2005||3–1 || align="left"| @ Mighty Ducks of Anaheim (2005–06) ||11–6–1 || 
|- align="center" bgcolor="#CCFFCC" 
|19||W||November 16, 2005||4–2 || align="left"| @ Mighty Ducks of Anaheim (2005–06) ||12–6–1 || 
|- align="center" bgcolor="#CCFFCC" 
|20||W||November 18, 2005||6–3 || align="left"|  Columbus Blue Jackets (2005–06) ||13–6–1 || 
|- align="center" bgcolor="#CCFFCC" 
|21||W||November 23, 2005||3–1 || align="left"|  Mighty Ducks of Anaheim (2005–06) ||14–6–1 || 
|- align="center" bgcolor="#FFBBBB"
|22||L||November 25, 2005||1–4 || align="left"|  Phoenix Coyotes (2005–06) ||14–7–1 || 
|- align="center" bgcolor="#CCFFCC" 
|23||W||November 26, 2005||3–1 || align="left"| @ Nashville Predators (2005–06) ||15–7–1 || 
|- align="center" bgcolor="#CCFFCC" 
|24||W||November 30, 2005||4–1 || align="left"|  San Jose Sharks (2005–06) ||16–7–1 || 
|-

|- align="center" bgcolor="#CCFFCC" 
|25||W||December 2, 2005||5–4 SO|| align="left"|  Carolina Hurricanes (2005–06) ||17–7–1 || 
|- align="center" bgcolor="#CCFFCC" 
|26||W||December 7, 2005||4–3 || align="left"|  Florida Panthers (2005–06) ||18–7–1 || 
|- align="center" bgcolor="#CCFFCC" 
|27||W||December 10, 2005||2–1 || align="left"| @ Toronto Maple Leafs (2005–06) ||19–7–1 || 
|- align="center" bgcolor="#FFBBBB"
|28||L||December 14, 2005||3–4 || align="left"| @ Buffalo Sabres (2005–06) ||19–8–1 || 
|- align="center" bgcolor="#CCFFCC" 
|29||W||December 15, 2005||2–0 || align="left"| @ Ottawa Senators (2005–06) ||20–8–1 || 
|- align="center" bgcolor="#CCFFCC" 
|30||W||December 18, 2005||5–3 || align="left"| @ Chicago Blackhawks (2005–06) ||21–8–1 || 
|- align="center" bgcolor="#FFBBBB"
|31||L||December 19, 2005||1–2 || align="left"| @ Minnesota Wild (2005–06) ||21–9–1 || 
|- align="center" bgcolor="#CCFFCC" 
|32||W||December 21, 2005||5–3 || align="left"| @ Columbus Blue Jackets (2005–06) ||22–9–1 || 
|- align="center" bgcolor="#FFBBBB"
|33||L||December 23, 2005||2–3 || align="left"|  Phoenix Coyotes (2005–06) ||22–10–1 || 
|- align="center" bgcolor="#CCFFCC" 
|34||W||December 26, 2005||6–1 || align="left"| @ St. Louis Blues (2005–06) ||23–10–1 || 
|- align="center" bgcolor="#FFBBBB"
|35||L||December 27, 2005||1–4 || align="left"|  Detroit Red Wings (2005–06) ||23–11–1 || 
|- align="center" bgcolor="#CCFFCC" 
|36||W||December 29, 2005||3–0 || align="left"|  St. Louis Blues (2005–06) ||24–11–1 || 
|- align="center" bgcolor="#FFBBBB"
|37||L||December 31, 2005||2–3 || align="left"|  Los Angeles Kings (2005–06) ||24–12–1 || 
|-

|- align="center" 
|38||L||January 2, 2006||2–3 OT|| align="left"| @ Los Angeles Kings (2005–06) ||24–12–2 || 
|- align="center" bgcolor="#CCFFCC" 
|39||W||January 4, 2006||3–1 || align="left"|  Vancouver Canucks (2005–06) ||25–12–2 || 
|- align="center" bgcolor="#CCFFCC" 
|40||W||January 6, 2006||4–3 SO|| align="left"|  Mighty Ducks of Anaheim (2005–06) ||26–12–2 || 
|- align="center" bgcolor="#CCFFCC" 
|41||W||January 8, 2006||6–3 || align="left"| @ Detroit Red Wings (2005–06) ||27–12–2 || 
|- align="center" bgcolor="#CCFFCC" 
|42||W||January 9, 2006||2–1 || align="left"| @ Minnesota Wild (2005–06) ||28–12–2 || 
|- align="center" bgcolor="#CCFFCC" 
|43||W||January 12, 2006||4–1 || align="left"|  Washington Capitals (2005–06) ||29–12–2 || 
|- align="center" bgcolor="#CCFFCC" 
|44||W||January 14, 2006||2–1 SO|| align="left"| @ Boston Bruins (2005–06) ||30–12–2 || 
|- align="center" bgcolor="#FFBBBB"
|45||L||January 16, 2006||2–4 || align="left"| @ Montreal Canadiens (2005–06) ||30–13–2 || 
|- align="center" bgcolor="#FFBBBB"
|46||L||January 18, 2006||2–5 || align="left"|  Atlanta Thrashers (2005–06) ||30–14–2 || 
|- align="center" bgcolor="#FFBBBB"
|47||L||January 20, 2006||3–6 || align="left"|  Tampa Bay Lightning (2005–06) ||30–15–2 || 
|- align="center" bgcolor="#CCFFCC" 
|48||W||January 23, 2006||4–1 || align="left"|  Phoenix Coyotes (2005–06) ||31–15–2 || 
|- align="center" bgcolor="#CCFFCC" 
|49||W||January 25, 2006||4–3 SO|| align="left"|  St. Louis Blues (2005–06) ||32–15–2 || 
|- align="center" bgcolor="#CCFFCC" 
|50||W||January 26, 2006||3–2 SO|| align="left"| @ Colorado Avalanche (2005–06) ||33–15–2 || 
|- align="center" bgcolor="#CCFFCC" 
|51||W||January 28, 2006||2–1 SO|| align="left"|  Detroit Red Wings (2005–06) ||34–15–2 || 
|- align="center" bgcolor="#CCFFCC" 
|52||W||January 30, 2006||3–2 OT|| align="left"|  San Jose Sharks (2005–06) ||35–15–2 || 
|-

|- align="center" bgcolor="#CCFFCC" 
|53||W||February 1, 2006||2–1 || align="left"|  Nashville Predators (2005–06) ||36–15–2 || 
|- align="center" 
|54||L||February 4, 2006||3–4 OT|| align="left"| @ St. Louis Blues (2005–06) ||36–15–3 || 
|- align="center" bgcolor="#CCFFCC" 
|55||W||February 6, 2006||4–2 || align="left"|  Nashville Predators (2005–06) ||37–15–3 || 
|- align="center" bgcolor="#CCFFCC" 
|56||W||February 9, 2006||5–1 || align="left"| @ Phoenix Coyotes (2005–06) ||38–15–3 || 
|- align="center" bgcolor="#FFBBBB"
|57||L||February 10, 2006||3–6 || align="left"| @ San Jose Sharks (2005–06) ||38–16–3 || 
|- align="center" bgcolor="#FFBBBB"
|58||L||February 12, 2006||5–6 || align="left"| @ Los Angeles Kings (2005–06) ||38–17–3 || 
|-

|- align="center" bgcolor="#FFBBBB"
|59||L||March 2, 2006||2–6 || align="left"| @ Phoenix Coyotes (2005–06) ||38–18–3 || 
|- align="center" bgcolor="#CCFFCC" 
|60||W||March 4, 2006||5–3 || align="left"|  Colorado Avalanche (2005–06) ||39–18–3 || 
|- align="center" bgcolor="#CCFFCC" 
|61||W||March 5, 2006||7–2 || align="left"| @ Chicago Blackhawks (2005–06) ||40–18–3 || 
|- align="center" bgcolor="#CCFFCC" 
|62||W||March 7, 2006||4–3 SO|| align="left"| @ Edmonton Oilers (2005–06) ||41–18–3 || 
|- align="center" bgcolor="#FFBBBB"
|63||L||March 9, 2006||0–1 || align="left"| @ Calgary Flames (2005–06) ||41–19–3 || 
|- align="center" bgcolor="#CCFFCC" 
|64||W||March 11, 2006||2–1 || align="left"| @ Vancouver Canucks (2005–06) ||42–19–3 || 
|- align="center" bgcolor="#CCFFCC" 
|65||W||March 13, 2006||4–2 || align="left"|  Vancouver Canucks (2005–06) ||43–19–3 || 
|- align="center" bgcolor="#CCFFCC" 
|66||W||March 16, 2006||4–1 || align="left"| @ Los Angeles Kings (2005–06) ||44–19–3 || 
|- align="center" bgcolor="#CCFFCC" 
|67||W||March 18, 2006||4–3 SO|| align="left"| @ San Jose Sharks (2005–06) ||45–19–3 || 
|- align="center" bgcolor="#FFBBBB"
|68||L||March 20, 2006||1–2 || align="left"|  Mighty Ducks of Anaheim (2005–06) ||45–20–3 || 
|- align="center" bgcolor="#CCFFCC" 
|69||W||March 22, 2006||4–2 || align="left"|  Minnesota Wild (2005–06) ||46–20–3 || 
|- align="center" bgcolor="#CCFFCC" 
|70||W||March 24, 2006||3–2 SO|| align="left"|  Chicago Blackhawks (2005–06) ||47–20–3 || 
|- align="center" bgcolor="#CCFFCC" 
|71||W||March 26, 2006||3–2 || align="left"|  Calgary Flames (2005–06) ||48–20–3 || 
|- align="center" bgcolor="#CCFFCC" 
|72||W||March 29, 2006||2–1 || align="left"|  Mighty Ducks of Anaheim (2005–06) ||49–20–3 || 
|- align="center" 
|73||L||March 31, 2006||4–5 SO|| align="left"| @ Mighty Ducks of Anaheim (2005–06) ||49–20–4 || 
|-

|- align="center" bgcolor="#FFBBBB"
|74||L||April 1, 2006||0–1 || align="left"| @ Los Angeles Kings (2005–06) ||49–21–4 || 
|- align="center" 
|75||L||April 3, 2006||2–3 OT|| align="left"|  San Jose Sharks (2005–06) ||49–21–5 || 
|- align="center" bgcolor="#CCFFCC" 
|76||W||April 6, 2006||5–3 || align="left"| @ Mighty Ducks of Anaheim (2005–06) ||50–21–5 || 
|- align="center" bgcolor="#CCFFCC" 
|77||W||April 8, 2006||3–2 SO|| align="left"| @ Phoenix Coyotes (2005–06) ||51–21–5 || 
|- align="center" bgcolor="#FFBBBB"
|78||L||April 9, 2006||1–4 || align="left"| @ San Jose Sharks (2005–06) ||51–22–5 || 
|- align="center" bgcolor="#CCFFCC" 
|79||W||April 11, 2006||3–2 || align="left"|  Columbus Blue Jackets (2005–06) ||52–22–5 || 
|- align="center" bgcolor="#CCFFCC" 
|80||W||April 15, 2006||4–3 OT|| align="left"|  Minnesota Wild (2005–06) ||53–22–5 || 
|- align="center" bgcolor="#FFBBBB"
|81||L||April 17, 2006||2–3 || align="left"| @ Detroit Red Wings (2005–06) ||53–23–5 || 
|- align="center" 
|82||L||April 18, 2006||4–5 OT|| align="left"| @ Columbus Blue Jackets (2005–06) ||53–23–6 || 
|-

|-
| Legend:

Playoffs

|- align="center" bgcolor="#FFBBBB"
| 1 ||L|| April 22, 2006 || 2–5 || align="left"| Colorado Avalanche || Avalanche lead 1–0 || 
|- align="center" bgcolor="#FFBBBB"
| 2 ||L|| April 24, 2006 || 4–5 OT || align="left"| Colorado Avalanche || Avalanche lead 2–0 || 
|- align="center" bgcolor="#FFBBBB"
| 3 ||L|| April 26, 2006 || 3–4 OT || align="left"| @ Colorado Avalanche || Avalanche lead 3–0 || 
|- align="center" bgcolor="#CCFFCC"
| 4 ||W|| April 28, 2006 || 4–1 || align="left"| @ Colorado Avalanche || Avalanche lead 3–1 || 
|- align="center" bgcolor="#FFBBBB"
| 5 ||L|| April 30, 2006 || 2–3 OT || align="left"| Colorado Avalanche || Avalanche win 4–1 || 
|-

|-
| Legend:

Player statistics

Scoring
 Position abbreviations: C = Center; D = Defense; G = Goaltender; LW = Left Wing; RW = Right Wing
  = Joined team via a transaction (e.g., trade, waivers, signing) during the season. Stats reflect time with the Stars only.
  = Left team via a transaction (e.g., trade, waivers, release) during the season. Stats reflect time with the Stars only.

Goaltending

Awards and records

Awards

Transactions
The Stars were involved in the following transactions from February 17, 2005, the day after the 2004–05 NHL season was officially cancelled, through June 19, 2006, the day of the deciding game of the 2006 Stanley Cup Finals.

Trades

Players acquired

Players lost

Signings

Draft picks
Dallas' picks at the 2005 NHL Entry Draft in Ottawa, Ontario.

Farm teams
The Stars American Hockey League Affiliate for the 2005–06 season were the Iowa Stars, based in Des Moines, Iowa. They also became affiliated with the Idaho Steelheads of the ECHL.

See also
2005–06 NHL season

Notes

References

Dall
Dall
Dallas Stars seasons